= Lizzie Aguzzi =

- Born: Elizabeth Clarice Aguzzi; 4 February 1856; Lambeth, London, England
- Died: 1938 (aged 81–82)
- Occupation: Circus equestrian performer
- Parent(s): Antoni Aguzzi; Helen Schmidt

Elizabeth Clarice Aguzzi (4 February 1856 – 1938), was a British Circus equestrian performer.

She was born at 3 Felix Street, Lambeth, London, as the daughter of the equestrian performer Antoni Aguzzi (1809/10–1880) and Helen Schmidt (1824–1903). She was a famous performer in the Circus stage of her time, known from the 1870s and onward. She was foremost famed as a bareback and trick act rider.
